Peckoltia is a genus of small South American armored suckermouth catfishes. Many of these fish are popular aquarium fish.

Taxonomy
Peckoltia is a basal genus within the tribe Ancistrini of the subfamily Hypostominae. This genus is paraphyletic. At this point, many undescribed species remain. Many of the possibly undescribed species have an identification through the L-number system.

Peckoltia species can be distinguished from most other in the genera in the tribe Ancistrini by having a lateral ridge on the opercle that usually has no odontodes and the teeth on their upper jaw (dentary) forming an angle under 90 degrees; while some genera also have an angled dentary, Peckoltia species lack synapomorphies of these genera. This genus and the closely related Hemiancistrus may be synonymous, as neither genus is supported by synapomorphies. Generally, Peckoltia are considered to be those that have dorsal saddles and bands in the fins, while Heminancistrus have spots and uniform coloration. This genus is also similar to Hypancistrus and Panaque except for differences in teeth. Teeth on both jaws are the same size as opposed to different sizes, which is different from Hypancistrus where the upper jaw teeth are larger. Also, the teeth are villiform (brush-shaped) rather than spoon-shaped, in contrast to the Panaque.

The classification of some of the species in this genus has been confused. P. yaravi has been moved to Neblinichthys. P. sabaji was arbitrarily placed in this genus (as opposed to Hemiancistrus), but may even represent its own genus; later, it has been placed in Hemiancistrus but  (Armbruster et al. 2015) placed the species in the genus Peckoltia. Peckoltia bachi is placed in the genus Peckoltichthys and Peckoltia snethlageae and Peckoltia feldbergae are placed in the genus Ancistomus.

Species

There are currently 21 recognized species in this genus:
 Peckoltia braueri (C. H. Eigenmann, 1912) (Worm-line peckoltia)
 Peckoltia brevis (La Monte, 1935)
 Peckoltia caenosa Armbruster, 2008 
 Peckoltia capitulata Fisch-Muller & Covain, 2012 
 Peckoltia cavatica Armbruster & Werneke, 2005
 Peckoltia compta R. R. de Oliveira, Zuanon, Rapp Py-Daniel & M. S. Rocha, 2010 
 Peckoltia ephippiata Armbruster, Werneke & M. Tan, 2015 
 Peckoltia furcata (Fowler, 1940)
 Peckoltia greedoi Armbruster, Werneke & M. Tan, 2015 
 Peckoltia lineola Armbruster, 2008 
 Peckoltia lujani Armbruster, Werneke & M. Tan, 2015 
 Peckoltia multispinis (Holly, 1929) (Bristle-mouth catfish)
 Peckoltia oligospila (Günther, 1864)
 Peckoltia otali Fisch-Muller & Covain, 2012 
 Peckoltia pankimpuju (Lujan & Chamon, 2008) 
 Peckoltia relictum (Lujan, Armbruster & Rengifo, 2011) 
 Peckoltia sabaji Armbruster, 2003
 Peckoltia simulata Fisch-Muller & Covain, 2012 
 Peckoltia vermiculata (Steindachner, 1908)
 Peckoltia vittata (Steindachner, 1881)
 Peckoltia wernekei Armbruster & Lujan, 2016

Distribution and habitat
Peckoltia inhabit freshwater habitats in the Amazon basin, upper Orinoco, upper Essequibo River, and also possibly the Maroni River, as well as coastal drainages north of the Amazon to French Guiana. Three species, P. braueri, P. cavatica and P. sabaji are found in the Guiana Shield.

Peckoltia live in shallow, rocky riffles and in quieter water where they hide inside cavities in submerged logs.

Appearance and anatomy
Peckoltia are members of the family Loricariidae, the armored suckermouth catfishes. As such, they have armor plating on their body instead of scales. Also, they have a suckermouth which they use to cling to rocks in their habitat. They have the characteristic Loricariid omega iris as well. Like many other catfish, Peckoltia have strong pectoral and dorsal fin spines that can be locked outwards as a defense.

Peckoltia have unmodified teeth and the teeth on their upper jaw form an angle under 90 degrees. Most male Peckoltia have hypertrophied odontodes on their body during the breeding season.

The biggest difference between all the Peckoltia species is coloration. They usually have a saddle-shaped marking on their back. However, P. caenosa are mottled.

Four species, P. braueri, P. caenosa, P. cavatica and P. vittata, lack spots on their head while the rest have them. P. braueri and P. cavatica have orange bands in the dorsal and caudal fins and have the bones and plates of the head and nape outlined in black; in P. caenosa and P. vittata, there are no orange bands and head plates and bones are not outlined. P. caenosa has dark vermiculations on the head and abdomen. P. vittata has saddles or blotches on the head and faint dark spots on the abdomen. P. lineola and P. vermiculata have spots on their head that combine to form vermiculations. In P. lineola the spots form vermiculations that are wider than its pupils, while in P. vermiculata the spots form vermiculations narrower than its pupils; also, the vermiculations radiate from a central point on the head in P. vermiculata, while there is no such pattern in P. lineola.

In the aquarium
True Peckoltia species are fairly rarely exported for the pet trade; species called Peckoltia may actually be Panaque or Hypancistrus species. Peckoltia species are popular aquarium fish as they are small and attractive. They are shy and will spend much of the day hiding.

In 2013, aquarists reported breeding P. braueri in captivity for the first time.

References

Ancistrini
Fish of South America
Catfish genera
Taxa named by Alípio de Miranda-Ribeiro
Freshwater fish genera